Grand-Lahou is a coastal town in southern Ivory Coast. It is a sub-prefecture of and the seat of Grand-Lahou Department in Grands-Ponts Region, Lagunes District. Grand-Lahou is also a commune.

Grand-Lahou is situated where the Bandama River meets the Gulf of Guinea. It was occupied by the British, Germans and Dutch before the French developed it as a trading port from 1890. Grand-Lahou is a popular base for visitors to the Assagny National Park.

In 2021, the population of the sub-prefecture of Grand-Lahou was 77,479.

Villages
The twenty villages of the sub-prefecture of Grand-Lahou and their population in 2014 are:

References

Sub-prefectures of Grands-Ponts
Communes of Grands-Ponts